Embryonic Anomaly is the debut studio album by American deathcore band Rings of Saturn. It was produced by Bob Swanson at Mayhemness Studios located in Sacramento, California. It was self-released by the band on May 25, 2010. Four months after the release, the band signed to Unique Leader Records. This was the only album to feature Peter Pawlak on vocals.

A remake of Embryonic Anomaly was released in February 2021 as part of the 10 year anniversary for the original CD. The remake includes new album art by Mark Cooper, production by Sammy Morales and drumming redone by Marco Pitruzzella.

Promotion and release
Embryonic Anomaly was re-released through Unique Leader on March 1, 2011. Unlike the band's second album Dingir, Embryonic Anomaly was recorded with the original lineup of only three members while they were at the ages ranging from 16 to 18 and were still attending high school.

Track listing

Personnel
Rings of Saturn
 Peter Pawlak – vocals, vocal arrangement
 Lucas Mann – guitars, bass, keyboards, synthesizers, programming, vocal arrangement
 Brent Silletto – drums

Additional personnel
 Bob Swanson – production, mixing, mastering, tracking
 Jon Leyden – tracking
 Tony Koehl – artwork, photography
 Sammy Morales (2021 remake) – production, mixing, mastering

References

2010 debut albums
Rings of Saturn (band) albums
Unique Leader Records albums